Aiman was an Indonesian flagship television Investigation news program that broadcasts on Kompas TV. On January 19, 2015, it aired its first episode, Kisah Para Pahlawan dalam Tragedi Pesawat Air Asia QZ8501. It selects the latest and best-selling news throughout the week to be aired more fully and deeply through the program airing Monday.

This program contains a variety of current social issues that are a hot issue in the community, will be discussed in this program. Aiman Witjaksono will invite viewers of Kompas TV to understand various social or community issues in the style of journalistic investigation.

In this program, Aiman will invite viewers to take part directly in the field, gather facts, and interview related people in an event.

This program ended on October 3, 2022 as Aiman ​​resigned from Kompas TV a week later, on October 10, 2022 announcement from his Instagram.

References

External links 
 

Indonesian television news shows
Indonesian-language television shows
2015 Indonesian television series debuts
2010s Indonesian television series
Kompas TV

Kompas TV original programming